Chilo prophylactes is a moth in the family Crambidae. It was described by Edward Meyrick in 1934. It is found in the Democratic Republic of the Congo and South Africa.

References

Chiloini
Moths described in 1934